The following lists events that happened during 1980 in Cape Verde.

Incumbents
President: Aristides Pereira
Prime Minister: Pedro Pires

Events
March: Population: 296,050
March 27: National Technological Investigation Institute (INIT - Instituto Nacional de Investigação Tecnológica) established, now part of the University of Cape Verde

Sports
Botafogo of Fogo won the Cape Verdean Football Championship

References

 
Years of the 20th century in Cape Verde
1980s in Cape Verde
Cape Verde
Cape Verde